Better than the Beatles: A Tribute to the Shaggs is a tribute album consisting of cover versions of songs by the American band the Shaggs. It includes songs from their 1965 album Philosophy of the World and the 1982 compilation Shaggs' Own Thing.

The album title is a reference to the musician Frank Zappa, who is often reported as having called the Shaggs "better than the Beatles". Though Zappa was an admirer of the Shaggs, the quote may be apocryphal.

Track listing
 Philosophy of the World - Ida
 You're Something Special to Me - Optiganally Yours
 Who Are Parents? - Thinking Fellers Union Local 282
 My Cutie - Mongrell
 We Have a Savior - Bauer
 It's Halloween - Joost Visser
 My Pal Foot Foot - Deerhoof
 My Companion - R. Stevie Moore
 Shaggs' Own Thing - Plastic Mastery
 Painful Memories/Wheels - Slot Racer
 Who Are Parents? - Danielson Famile
 You're Something Special to Me - Furtips
 Philosophy of the World - The Double U

References

The Shaggs
The Shaggs tribute albums
2001 compilation albums